Thomas Hutchison (born 22 September 1947) is a Scottish former footballer who played as a midfielder. He made over 1,100 appearances, including 314 in the Football League alone for Coventry City, and more than 160 apiece in the competition for Blackpool and Swansea City (serving the latter as manager for a season before resuming as a player, which continued into his mid-40s), plus shorter spells in the United States and Hong Kong. Hutchison gained 17 caps for Scotland between 1973 and 1975.

Club career 
Born in Cardenden, Fife, Hutchison began his professional career with Alloa Athletic in the Scottish Second Division, after he was spotted by manager Archie McPherson. He showed enough potential to attract the attention of larger clubs, and he joined Stan Mortensen's Blackpool in February 1968 for just over £10,000. Almost immediately, he took the place of Graham Oates at outside-left, making his debut against Plymouth on 30 March in the English Second Division.

The Scot was brought in to bolster the Seasiders flagging promotion drive, and out of the final nine games of the 1967–68 season, they won eight. Promotion, however, was missed on the final day.

Les Shannon took over from Mortensen as manager, and in his first season achieved promotion to the First Division in 1970 – but it only lasted one season. When Bob Stokoe took over from Shannon in June 1971, he worked on Hutchison's crossing ability, believing it to be his only weak spot.

In 1972, Coventry City manager Joe Mercer offered £140,000 cash plus Billy Rafferty for Hutchison's services. He signed for the Midlands club, leaping at the chance to play in the First Division on a regular basis. 'Hutch' remained at Highfield Road for eight years, playing 355 games and scoring 30 goals. During his time at Coventry he played probably the best football of his career, winning all of his 17 Scottish caps while at the club. Nicknamed "Mr Magic" by the club chairman, Derrick Robins, he was voted supporter's Player of the Season three times during his eight-year spell at Highfield Road – a feat no other Sky Blues player has yet equalled.

Hutchison joined Manchester City for a fee of £47,000 in October 1980, becoming John Bond's first signing at Maine Road. In May 1981, he scored for both sides in the FA Cup Final, as Tottenham Hotspur drew 1–1 with Manchester City. He was not the first to do this — Bert Turner had done so in the 1946 final for Charlton and Derby, and Gary Mabbutt would do the same in the 1987 final for Coventry City and Tottenham Hotspur. He had initially put City in the lead, but his own goal (deflecting a free-kick) meant that the final would go to a replay, which City lost 3–2 five days later.

Hutchison later played for Bulova of Hong Kong and Seattle Sounders (US) before returning to the UK, re-joining John Bond at Burnley in 1983 and moving to Swansea City in 1985 to be managed by Bond at a third different club in his career. When Bond departed, Hutchison served as manager for six months after the club went into liquidation. Come September 1989, Hutchison – now just shy of his 42nd birthday – made his debut in European club competition. Having won the Welsh FA Cup the season before, Swansea entered the UEFA Cup Winner's Cup, and were drawn against Greek giants Panathinaikos. They were eliminated at the First Round stage, but not before giving the Greek team a scare losing 3–2 in Athens and drawing 3–3 at Vetch Field. He is in the record books as the oldest player to have played for Swansea City, playing against Southend United in March 1991 at the age of 43 years, five months and 19 days.

In late-May and early-June 1984, Hutchison made three guest appearances for Manchester United on their summer tour of Australia, playing against Australia, Nottingham Forest and Juventus. He then made another guest appearance for the club the following May, when he played in Peter Foley's testimonial against an Oxford United XI.

He left Swansea near the end of the 1990–91 season, and joined Southern League side Merthyr Tydfil, where he spent another three years before finally retiring from the game in May 1994, at the age of 46, having played more than a thousand first-team games in his career.

International career 
Capped 17 times for Scotland, Hutchison appeared at the 1974 World Cup, though was surprisingly omitted from the 1978 World Cup squad in Argentina when he was arguably playing the finest football of his career.

Retirement 
On retiring from league football at the age of 43, he joined non-league Merthyr Tydfil where he played for three seasons, finally hanging-up his boots in 1994. He remained in South Wales until 2012, working as a Football Development Officer across the Severn Estuary for Bristol City, but moved back to live in Scotland. A poll by the Coventry Evening Telegraph voted him the most popular Coventry player of the club's First Division era.

Blackpool F.C. Hall of Fame 
Hutchison was inducted into the Hall of Fame at Bloomfield Road, when it was officially opened by former Blackpool player Jimmy Armfield in April 2006. Organised by the Blackpool Supporters Association, Blackpool fans around the world voted on their all-time heroes. Five players from each decade are inducted; Hutchison is in the 1970s.

Honours

Club 
Blackpool
Anglo-Italian Cup: 1971

Seattle Sounders
North American Soccer League National Conference Western Division Champions: 1979–80

Manchester City
FA Cup runner-up: 1980–81

Bulova
Hong Kong FA Cup: 1981–82, 1982–83
Hong Kong Viceroy Cup: 1981–82, 1982–83

Swansea City
Welsh Cup: 1988–89

Individual 
 Coventry City Hall of Fame

See also 
List of footballers in England by number of league appearances
List of men's footballers with the most official appearances

References

Further reading

External links 

Hutchison in the Blackpool Supporters Association Hall of Fame
Tommy Hutchison visits Highbridge in Somerset

1947 births
Living people
Scottish footballers
Alloa Athletic F.C. players
Blackpool F.C. players
Coventry City F.C. players
Manchester City F.C. players
North American Soccer League (1968–1984) players
Bulova SA players
Expatriate footballers in Hong Kong
Burnley F.C. players
Swansea City A.F.C. players
Merthyr Tydfil F.C. players
Scotland international footballers
1974 FIFA World Cup players
Seattle Sounders (1974–1983) players
Hong Kong First Division League players
Scottish football managers
Scottish expatriate footballers
Swansea City A.F.C. managers
English Football League players
People from Cardenden
Footballers from Fife
Scotland under-23 international footballers
Dundonald Bluebell F.C. players
Association football midfielders
Scottish expatriate sportspeople in the United States
Expatriate soccer players in the United States
Scottish Junior Football Association players
Scottish Football League players
FA Cup Final players